Barth may refer to:

Places
 Barth, Germany, a town in Mecklenburg-Western Pomerania, Germany
Barth (Amt), administrative subdivision
 Barth Island, Nunavut, Canada

Other uses
 Barth (name), a surname (and list of people with that name)
 Barth Bagge, a character from the television show "You Can't Do That on Television"
 Barth Classic, a golf tournament on the LPGA Tour from 1974 to 1980

See also
Barth syndrome, a metabolic disorder
 Barthes (disambiguation)
 Barthe (disambiguation)